Tirupperuvelur Abhimuktheeswarar Temple
() is a Hindu temple located at Manakkal ayyempet  in Tiruvarur district, Tamil Nadu, India.
The temple is dedicated to Shiva, as the moolavar presiding deity, in his manifestation as Avimuktheswarar. His consort, Parvati, is known as Baagampriyal. The place is also known as Tirupperuvelur.

Significance 
It is one of the shrines of the 275 Paadal Petra Sthalams - Shiva Sthalams glorified in the early medieval Tevaram poems by Tamil Saivite Nayanars Tirugnanasambandar and Tirunavukkarasar.

Literary mention 
Tirugnanasambandar describes the feature of the deity as:

References

External links

Photogallery 

Shiva temples in Tiruvarur district
Padal Petra Stalam